Brask is a Scandinavian surname. Notable people with the surname include:

Bent Brask (born 1958). Norwegian swimmer
Bill Brask (1946 - ), American golfer
Birte Høeg Brask
Christina Brask (1459–1520), Swedish writer and translator
Hans Brask (1464–1538), Bishop of Linköping, Sweden
Kristiina Brask (born 1990), Finnish pop singer
Ole Brask

References 
Swedish-language surnames